The following contains a list of Major League Baseball players who lived to the age of 100. For other baseball players and others associated with baseball who were centenarians, see List of centenarians (sportspeople). For other lists of centenarians, see lists of centenarians.

Actuarial considerations

No major league player reached the age of 100 until . The majority of ballplayers in 1876 could not have lived to age 100 until after , and there had not been enough players for a reasonable statistical expectation of one becoming a centenarian until the 1970s.

Actuarial data

As early as the 1930s, big league players were exhibiting either a healthy worker effect or the health benefits of the rigorous fitness regimens of professional athletes, or both. However, in this study, vital data on baseball players were limited to those available in the  Baseball Encyclopedia.

One large study examining major league ballplayers with debuts from 1902 and 2004 found that their expected lifespan was almost five years longer than average 20-year-old American males, and that career length was inversely associated with the risk of death, probably because those who play ball longer gained additional income, physical fitness, and training.

The ballplayers

See also

References

Major
Centenarians